Queen's Park railway station is a railway station serving the Queen's Park, Govanhill and Strathbungo areas of Glasgow, Scotland. It is located on the Cathcart Circle Line. Services are provided by ScotRail on behalf of Strathclyde Partnership for Transport.

History 

The station maintains its original island platform and station building to this day.

The lines through the station were electrified under British Railways as part of the Glasgow South Bank Electrification in May 1962.

From July to August 2008, the Cathcart Circle was closed for a short period to allow for subsidence repair works near Pollokshields East railway station. During this closure, Queen's Park was, along with several other stations on the line, one of the first to receive the new ScotRail colours and signage that would replace Strathclyde Partnership for Transport and the incumbent franchise holder's branding.

Queen's Park station is now protected as a category B listed building. In 2011, part of the station was converted to house Queen's Park Railway Club, a contemporary art space.

Services

1979
Service provision consisted of two trains per hour between Neilston and Glasgow Central, two trains per hours between Newton and Glasgow Central, two trains per hour serving the Cathcart Inner Circle and two trains per hour serving the Cathcart Outer Circle Service.

2016
The Circle services do not operate on Sundays, so the overall frequency at the station drops to 3 per hour each way.

Routes

References

Notes

Sources

External links
Queens Park Railway Club

Railway stations in Glasgow
Former Caledonian Railway stations
Railway stations in Great Britain opened in 1886
SPT railway stations
Railway stations served by ScotRail
Govanhill and Crosshill